SMS Irene was a protected cruiser or Kreuzerkorvette of the German Imperial Navy (Kaiserliche Marine) and the lead ship of the . She had one sister, ; the two ships were the first protected cruisers built by the German Navy. Irene was laid down in 1886 at the AG Vulcan shipyard in Stettin, launched in July 1887, and commissioned into the fleet in May 1888. The cruiser was named after Princess Irene of Hesse and by Rhine, sister-in-law of Kaiser Wilhem II.

Irene saw extensive service with the German fleet in the first years of her career, frequently escorting Kaiser Wilhelm II's yacht on cruises throughout Europe. In 1894, she was deployed to East Asian waters; she was in dock for engine maintenance in November 1897 when Otto von Diederichs seized the naval base Kiaochou Bay, and so she was not present during the operation. She was present in the Philippines in the immediate aftermath of the Battle of Manila Bay between American and Spanish squadrons during the Spanish–American War in 1898. Irene eventually returned to Germany in 1901. She remained in service until early 1914, when she was retired from front-line service and converted into a submarine tender. She served in this capacity until 1921, when she was sold for scrap and broken up the following year.

Design 

Her propulsion system consisted of two Wolfsche 2-cylinder, double-expansion steam engines that drove a pair of screw propellers. Steam was provided by four coal-fired fire-tube boilers, which were ducted into a pair of funnels. She had a crew of 28 officers and 337 enlisted men.

The ship was armed with a main battery of four 15 cm RK L/30 guns in single pedestal mounts, supplied with 400 rounds of ammunition in total. Irene also carried ten shorter-barreled 15 cm RK L/22 guns in single mounts. The gun armament was rounded out by six 3.7 cm revolver cannon, which provided close-range defense against torpedo boats. She was also equipped with three  torpedo tubes with eight torpedoes, two launchers were mounted on the deck and the third was in the bow, below the waterline. 

The conning tower had sides that were 50 mm thick.

Modifications
The ship was modernized in Wilhelmshaven in 1903; work lasted until 1905. A secondary battery of eight  SK L/35 quick-firing (QF) guns was installed in place of the L/22 guns, and six  SK L/40 QF guns were added.

Service history 
Irene was the first protected cruiser built by the German navy. She was ordered under the contract name "Ersatz " and was laid down at the AG Vulcan shipyard in Stettin in 1886. She was launched on 23 July 1887, after which fitting-out work commenced. She was commissioned into the German navy on 25 May 1888.

In the summer of 1888, Irene joined the fleet that steamed to Great Britain to celebrate the coronation of Kaiser Wilhelm II. The Kaiser's brother, Prince Heinrich commanded the division, his flag flying in Irene. The fleet then held training maneuvers in the North Sea under command of Rear Admiral Friedrich Hollmann. Over the winter of 1889–1890, Irene and the II Division of the fleet went into the Mediterranean to escort the Kaiser's yacht, Hohenzollern. Prince Heinrich remained in command of Irene during the cruise. The Kaiser made state visits to Turkey and Italy, and called in ports throughout the region, including Athens and Venice. Irene and the rest of the squadron returned to Germany in April 1890.

In August 1890, Irene again escorted Hohenzollern to Britain, to participate in the Cowes Regatta. Directly thereafter, the two ships steamed to the island of Helgoland to celebrate the ceremonial transfer from Britain; there, the entire German fleet joined Irene and Hohenzollern for the ceremonies. In late November 1894, Irene was dispatched to Casablanca to protest the murder of a German businessman in the city. She then proceeded on to Asian waters to join the German naval presence in the region in the aftermath of the First Sino-Japanese War. Under Rear Admiral Paul Hoffmann, Irene became the flagship of the Cruiser Division, along with three older cruisers. By 1895, she had been joined by her sister , the rebuilt old ironclad , the light cruiser , the corvette , and the gunboat .

In 1896, Otto von Diederichs arrived in Asia to command the Cruiser Division; he spent the year reconnoitering the region for a suitable naval base. Late in the year, Irene had to put into Hong Kong for extensive engine maintenance, which was completed on 30 November. She rejoined the fleet on 3 December. In the meantime, Diederichs had completed the seizure of the Kiaochou Bay concession; the Cruiser Division was sent reinforcements and promoted to the East Asia Squadron. Irene was assigned to the I Division of the squadron. In the Spring of 1898, Irene was sent to Shanghai for periodic maintenance.

During the Spanish–American War in 1898, Irene steamed to Manila in the Philippines in the aftermath of the Battle of Manila Bay; she arrived in the harbor on 6 May. By 27 June, Irene had been joined by several other German warships, including , Diederichs's flagship. On the 27th, Irene was steaming into Manila Bay when she was stopped by the American revenue cutter Hugh McCulloch. On 5 July, Diederichs dispatched Irene to survey Subic Bay and to evacuate any German nationals in the area that were threatened by Filipino insurgents. While steaming off Isla Grande, Irene encountered the rebel ship Companie de Filipinas, which was threatening the Spanish garrison at Isla Grande. The rebel commander came aboard Irene to inform her captain of his activities; Obenheimer informed him that any act of war committed under the rebel flag was an act of piracy under international law. The rebels therefore agreed to return to port. Obenheimer inspected both the Spanish garrison on the island and the nearby rebel base in Olongapo. After unsuccessfully searching for German nationals in the area, Irene evacuated the noncombatants on Isla Grande on 7 July; while steaming out of Subic Bay, Irene encountered the American warships  and  without issue.

The American press exaggerated the encounter between Irene and the American ships, which prompted Diederichs to decide to send Irene away from the area to deflate tensions between the two countries. After returning to Manila and debarking the non-combatants, Irene was ordered to depart the Philippines. Irene relieved Arcona in Kiaochou, which was in turn ordered to steam to the Caroline and Mariana Islands to observe the American capture of Guam. Irene coaled in Mariveles before departing for Kiaochou on 9 July. While in Kiaochou, Irene conducted crew training. She returned to Manila in November, but remained there only briefly, before she was replaced by Kaiserin Augusta. Irene returned to Germany after 1901; in 1903 she went into drydock at the Imperial Shipyard in Wilhelmshaven for modernization, which was completed by 1905. She was stricken on 17 February 1914 and used as a submarine tender, based in Kiel. In 1916, she was transferred to Wilhelmshaven. She remained there until 26 November 1921, when she was sold for scrapping for 909,000 Marks. She was broken up the following year in Wilhelmshaven.

Notes

References

Further reading
 

Irene-class cruisers
Ships built in Stettin
1887 ships